Agios Serafeim ( meaning Saint Seraphim) is a village in the municipality of Kamena Vourla in Phthiotis, Greece. Its population was 725 in 2011. It is situated near the Malian Gulf coast.  Agios Serafeim is 5 km east of Molos, 8 km northwest of the town Kamena Vourla and 14 km northwest of Agios Konstantinos. The Motorway 1 (Athens - Thessaloniki) passes south of the village. The area is known for its olive production.

Historical population

See also

List of settlements in Phthiotis

References

External links
Agios Serafeim on GTP Travel Pages (in English and Greek)

Populated places in Phthiotis